Nina Metivier is a British screenwriter, best known for co-creating the teen thriller The A List.

Early life
Metivier was educated at Stockport Grammar School. Metivier credited the His Dark Materials novels for inspiring her to write.

Career
Metivier began her career in children's television, working as a script editor and development executive at Kindle Entertainment. She began a running collaboration with Dan Berlinka in 2014, co-creating and writing the children's mystery series Dixi for CBBC Online. It won the BAFTA award for Original Interactive Show in 2014. In 2018, she would reteam with Berlinka for The A List, which released on BBC iPlayer on 25 October 2018. The series would move to Netflix for the second season, which she also co-wrote.

She continued script editing on The Life and Adventures of Nick Nickleby and the eleventh series of Doctor Who. She would later write the fourth episode of the twelfth series, Nikola Tesla's Night of Terror.

References

External links
 

Living people
21st-century British women writers
British television writers
British women television writers
Women science fiction and fantasy writers
Year of birth missing (living people)